Batmönkhiin Erkhembayar is a Mongolian international footballer. He made his first appearance for the Mongolia national football team in 2013.

International career

International goals
Scores and results list Mongolia's goal tally first.

References

Mongolian footballers
Mongolia international footballers
Erchim players
Living people
Association football defenders
1991 births
Tuv Buganuud FC players